A bronze statue of Salvadoran archbishop Óscar Romero is installed in Los Angeles' MacArthur Park, in the U.S. state of California. The  6.5-foot, 450-pound sculpture was made in El Salvador by artist Joaquin Serrano. The artwork was installed in November 2013, and cost $350,000.

References 

Bronze sculptures in California
Monuments and memorials in Los Angeles
Outdoor sculptures in Greater Los Angeles
Sculptures of men in California
Statues in Los Angeles
Westlake, Los Angeles